Dinky Di's is a lost early 1990s Australian animated cartoon with anthropomorphic animal heroes who fight to prevent environmental damage and rescue endangered animals and bird species from the satanic Mr. Mephisto. It was created by Edward Mel Bradford and produced by Roo Films Brisbane and the Nine Network Australia. Associate Producer was Mike Heffernan, International Production Supervisor and additional conceptual development at Pacific Rim Studios. Storyboard Artists from script where, Ray Van Steenwyk & Bill Moselen. The show was also known as "The Dinky Di's Friends on Freedom's Frontier." The show taught children about the dangers of having carelessness for the planet and also for animals and plants that live on the earth. A common phrase used by fans and the creator of the show was "We show no fear!" "Do you?". The first part of the phrase was a quote from the theme song people would also use, more common with fans, the line "We show no fear, we show no pain."

Premise 
The Dinky Di's Friends on Freedoms Frontier is about a team of anthropomorphic animals who fight against evil creatures and animals who want to cause destruction to the earth and other animals. Their team is full of animals from all over the world and have many different specialties that serve to the Dinky Di's team. They're led by a kangaroo named Aussie along with a koala named Cass. The main antagonist of the show is named Mephisto who is disguised in a shadowy cloak and has red eyes. Mephisto, along with his usual servants, has many allies who are willing to fall to his allegiance to help him get his way. As the show goes on the Dinky Di's will get nearer and nearer to catching Mephisto, which will in the end happen on the last episode "Small Hippo, Big Bust."

The group of anthropomorphic animals are well organized with a command center, computer network, and high-tech amphibious vehicles. They are led by Aussie (a kangaroo), and Cass (a koala) and aided by characters from across the globe.

Mr. Mephisto, a shadowy figure with glowing red eyes, uses a gang of maligned beasts to do his dirty work: Rancid (a Rat), Hugo (a Hyena), Ganny (a Iguana), and others. Mephisto's true identity, however, is a true mystery to the Dinky Di's, and one which, when solved, will be a major step towards slowing damage to the planet.

Episodes 
Out of the 26-episode series only one full episode in English has survived. While the other only full episode that is known is in polish which is the first episode "Lost, One Dinky-Di." However, half of the first episode and about three minutes of "The Bibly Tale" episode also exist in English. At some point on the Kool tube website (the website Mel Bradford had) there was the episodes "The Bibly Tale" and "Howling Crystals" available to watch. The Kool Tube website is no longer around, however there is a few archives still without any new content except images and copyright information.

The following episode list has mostly been translated out of polish however, we know for sure that these episodes are the names for the English version of the show.

 "Lost, One Dinky Di"
 "Yesterday, Today, Tomorrow"
 "Baron of Babel"
 "Small Hippo, Big Bust"
 "The Bibly Tale"
 "Howling Crystals"

There is uncertainty of were the episodes "Howling Crystals" and "The Bibly Tale" go on the list episode wise.

Other names for the show 
When it aired in Poland, the series title was Grupa specjalna Eko. In Italian the show is known as Parola d'ordine: arriviamo!

Credits List 
 Associate Producer - Mike Heffernan
 Production Manager - Rhonda Fortescue
 Production Co-Ordinator - Kerry Mulgrew
 Production Accountants - Debra Cole and Lyn Paeiz 
 Production Secretary - Patricia Mcinally 
 Production Receptionist - Tammy Sovenyhazi 
 Script Editor - Mel Bradford
 Animation - Pacific Rim Studios
 Studio Representative - Richard Hindley 
 Character Designers - Kelvin Hawley, Brian Doyle, Andrew Trimmer, Glenn Ford, Fräntz Kantor, Ray Van Steenwyk, Sue Schmidt, Paul Fitzgerald, and Ted Blackall
 Backgrounds - Dean Taylor - Mr. Big, Peter Sheehan, Kelvin Hawley, Paul Fitzgerald, Andrew Trimmer, Glenn Ford, Ray Van Steenwyk, Sue Schmidt, Fräntz Kantor, Ted Blackall
 Props - Kelvin Hawley, Glenn Ford, Paul Fitzgerald, Andrew Trimmer, Sue Schmidt, Fräntz Kantor, Brian Doyle, Ray Van Steenwyk, and Ted Blackall
 Story Boarders - Bob Smith, Kelvin Hawley, Bill Moselen, Ray Van Steenwyk, Glenn Ford, Fräntz Kantor, Steve Lumley
 Script Clerk - Fiona Matters
 Voice Recordings - Sunshine Studios
 Character Voices - Gennie Nevinson, Ric Melbourne, Lee Perry, Grahame Matters, Tony Bellette
 Mag Tracks - Hoyts Jumbuck
 Theme Song/Cross the Line - Lyrics: Mel Bradford and Bob Lacastra Composer: Matthew Sloggett
 Post Supervisor - Rod Herbert
 Film Editor - Bob Bladsall

This Link has the List of credits on the episode at the end.

References 

Nine Network original programming
1990s Australian animated television series
Australian children's animated television series
Environmental television
Lost television shows